Marshall's Corners is an unincorporated place and community in geographic Ingram Township in the Unorganized West Part of Timiskaming District in northeastern Ontario, Canada. It is located on Concession Road 5, several kilometres northeast of Tomstown.

References

Other map sources:

Communities in Timiskaming District